Tropical and subtropical moist broadleaf forests (TSMF), also known as tropical moist forest, is a subtropical and tropical forest habitat type defined by the World Wide Fund for Nature.

Description 

TSMF is generally found in large, discontinuous patches centered on the equatorial belt and between the Tropic of Cancer and Tropic of Capricorn, TSMF are characterized by low variability in annual temperature and high levels of rainfall of more than  annually. Forest composition is dominated by evergreen and semi-deciduous tree species. These trees number in the thousands and contribute to the highest levels of species diversity in any terrestrial major habitat type. In general, biodiversity is highest in the forest canopy. The canopy can be divided into five layers: overstory canopy with emergent crowns, a medium layer of canopy, lower canopy, shrub level, and finally understory.

These forests are home to more species than any other terrestrial ecosystem: Half of the world's species may live in these forests, where a square kilometer may be home to more than 1,000 tree species. These forests are found around the world, particularly in the Indo-Malayan Archipelago, the Amazon Basin, and the African Congo Basin.

A perpetually warm, wet climate makes these environments more productive than any other terrestrial environment on Earth and promotes explosive plant growth. From above, the forest appears as an unending sea of green, broken only by occasional, taller "emergent" trees. These towering emergents are the realm of hornbills, toucans, and the harpy eagle.

The canopy is home to many of the forest's animals, including apes and monkeys. Below the canopy, a lower understory hosts to snakes and big cats. The forest floor, relatively clear of undergrowth due to the thick canopy above, is prowled by other animals such as gorillas and deer.

Many forests are being cleared for farmland, while others are subject to large-scale commercial logging. An area the size of Ireland is destroyed every few years.

Types 

 
The biome includes several types of forests:

Lowland equatorial evergreen rain forests, commonly known as tropical rainforests, are forests which receive high rainfall (tropical rainforest climate with more than 2000 mm, or 80 inches, annually) throughout the year. These forests occur in a belt around the equator, with the largest areas in the Amazon basin of South America, the Congo basin of central Africa, the Wet Tropics of Queensland in Australia and parts of the Malay Archipelago. About half of the world's tropical rainforests are in the South American countries of Brazil and Peru. Rainforests now cover less than 6% of Earth's land surface. Scientists estimate that more than half of all the world's plant and animal species live in tropical rainforests.
 Tropical seasonal forests, also known as moist deciduous, monsoon or semi-evergreen (mixed) seasonal forests, have a monsoon or wet savannah climates (as in the Köppen climate classification): receiving high overall rainfall with a warm summer wet season and (often) a cooler winter dry season. Some trees in these forests drop some or all of their leaves during the winter dry season. These forests are found in South Florida, parts of South America, in Central America and around the Caribbean, in coastal West Africa, parts of the Indian subcontinent, Northern Australia and across much of Indochina.
 Montane rain forests are found in cooler-climate mountainous areas. Those with elevations high enough to regularly encounter low-level cloud cover are known as cloud forests.
 Flooded forests, including freshwater swamp forests and peat swamp forests.
Manigua a low, often impenetrable dense forest of tangled tropical shrub and small trees. It is usually found in marshy areas but also on dry land in certain places. The term is used in Cuba, the Dominican Republic, Puerto Rico and Colombia.

Notable ecoregions
A number of TSMF ecoregions are notable for their biodiversity and endemism:

 Southwest Amazon moist forests in Brazil, Peru and Bolivia
 Atlantic Forest in Brazil, Argentina and Paraguay
 Chocó–Darién moist forests in Colombia and Panama
 The Wet Tropics of Queensland in Australia
 Northwestern Andean montane forests of Colombia and Ecuador
 Guayanan Highlands moist forests
 Cuban moist forests
  Veracruz moist forests in Mexico
 Congolese rainforests
 Upper Guinean forests
 Albertine Rift montane forests from Uganda to Burundi
 Eastern Arc forests of Kenya and Tanzania
 Coastal forests of eastern Africa from Somalia to Mozambique
 Madagascar subhumid forests
 Puerto Rican moist forests
 Sri Lanka lowland rain forests
 Peninsular Malaysian peat swamp forests
 Borneo peat swamp forests
 New Caledonia rain forests
 Western Ghats

See also

 Tropical dry broadleaf forest
 Tropical coniferous forests
 Center for Tropical Forest Science (CTFS)
 International Tropical Timber Organization (ITTO)
 List of tropical and subtropical moist broadleaf forests ecoregions
 Monodominance
 Trees of the world
 Tropical vegetation
 Cloud forest

References

External links
 Facts about the world's tropical rainforests from The Nature Conservancy
 NASA picture of the afforestation of the earth in the year 2002
 BBC video clips and details of the species found here

 
Terrestrial biomes
Moist broadleaf forests
Forests
Rainforests